The women's 400 metre freestyle was a swimming event held as part of the swimming at the 1932 Summer Olympics programme. It was the third appearance of the event, which was established in 1924 after 1920 a 300 metre event was held. The competition was held on Thursday August 11, 1932 and on Saturday August 13, 1932.

Fourteen swimmers from nine nations competed.

Medalists

Records
These were the standing world and Olympic records (in minutes) prior to the 1932 Summer Olympics.

In the third heat Lenore Kight set a new Olympic record with 5:40.9 minutes. Helene Madison set a new world record in the final with 5:28.5 minutes.

Results

Heats

Thursday August 11, 1932: The fastest two in each heat and the fastest third-placed from across the heats advanced to the final.

Heat 1

Heat 2

Heat 3

Heat 4

Semifinals

Friday August 12, 1932: The fastest three in each semi-final advanced to the final. Marie Braun was not able to compete in the semi-finals. She had to stay in hospital due to blood poisoning after an infection officially caused by a mosquito bite.

Semifinal 1

Semifinal 2

Final

Saturday August 13, 1932:

References

External links
Olympic Report
 

Swimming at the 1932 Summer Olympics
1932 in women's swimming
Swim